The following is a list of notable events and releases of the year 1929 in Norwegian music.

Events

Deaths

 November
 23 – Arvid Kleven, composer and flautist (born 1899).

Births

 July
 1 – Sigurd Berge, composer (died 2002).

 March
 17 – Simon Flem Devold, clarinetist and columnist (died 2015).

 August
 28 – Sølvi Wang, singer and actress (died 2011).

 October
 30 – Finn Benestad, musicologist (died 2012)

See also
 1929 in Norway
 Music of Norway

References

 
Norwegian music
Norwegian
Music
1920s in Norwegian music